Francisco Vítor Silva Costa (born 24 October 1999), known as Vítor Jacaré or just Jacaré, is a Brazilian footballer who plays as a forward for Bahia.

Club career
Born in Caririaçu, Ceará, Jacaré never played in any youth setup until 2017, when he impressed while playing for an amateur side and subsequently joined Icasa. He made his senior debut with the side on 20 August of that year, starting in a 0–0 home draw against Caucaia, for the 2017 Copa Fares Lopes.

After only one further match, Jacaré was loaned to Fortaleza, where he featured mainly for the under-20 side and played one first team match in the Campeonato Cearense. In April 2019, after returning from loan, he rescinded with his parent club after alleging unpaid wages, and signed for Caucaia in the following month.

On 27 February 2020, after helping Caucaia win the second division of the Cearense and the Fares Lopes, Jacaré signed a pre-contract with Ceará. He was officially announced on 3 June, agreeing to a deal until December 2022.

Jacaré made his Série A debut on 8 August 2020, coming on as a half-time substitute for Rafael Sóbis in a 2–3 away loss against Sport Recife, also scoring his team's second goal of the match. In March of the following year, he suffered a knee injury which kept him out for eight months.

After returning from injury, Jacaré played in four matches in the 2022 season before rescinding his contract on 16 March, and joined Bahia.

Career statistics

Honours
Caucaia
Campeonato Cearense Série B: 2019
Copa Fares Lopes: 2019

References

External links
Ceará profile 

1999 births
Living people
Sportspeople from Ceará
Brazilian footballers
Association football forwards
Campeonato Brasileiro Série A players
Campeonato Brasileiro Série B players
Associação Desportiva Recreativa e Cultural Icasa players
Fortaleza Esporte Clube players
Ceará Sporting Club players
Esporte Clube Bahia players
Caucaia Esporte Clube players